This page lists Japan-related articles with romanized titles beginning with the letters Q–R. For names of people, please list by surname (i.e., "Tarō Yamada" should be listed under "Y", not "T"). Please also ignore particles (e.g. "a", "an", "the") when listing articles (i.e., "A City with No People" should be listed under "City").

Q
Qi
Qoo
Quarterstaff
The Queen's Classroom

R
R-Type
Rakuto Kasei
Refugees International Japan
Central Research Institute of Electric Power Industry

Ra
Rabaul
Radar Scope
Radical (Chinese character)
Radical Dreamers: Nusumenai Hōseki
Marimo Ragawa
Raichō
Raichu
Raiden
Raijū
Railway Construction Act
Railway Nationalization Act
Rainbow Bridge (Tokyo)
Rainbow Islands: The Story of Bubble Bobble 2
Raku ware
Rakugo
Ramen
Shin-Yokohama Raumen Museum
Ran (film)
Randori
Ranma ½
Rapi:t
Rashomon
Rashomon (film)
Rashomon (short story)
Rashōmon
Rattata
Amuro Ray

Re
Read or Die
Read or Die: The TV
Record of Lodoss War
Recreation and Amusement Association
Recruit (company)
Red Beard
Red seal ships
Regions of Japan
Regular script
Reihoku, Kumamoto
Reiki
Religion in Japan
Ren'ai CHU!
Renga
Renju
Renku
Renshi
Rensho
Republic of Ezo
Resident Evil (series)
Resona Holdings
Respect for the Aged Day
Reversi
Revolutionary Girl Utena
Rez

Ri
Rice cooker
Rice vinegar
Richard Sorge
Ricoh
Ricoh Caplio RX
Rie Tanaka
Rikki
Rikuchū Province
Rikuzen Province
Rikuzentakata, Iwate
Ring (film)
Rinzai school
Ritsumeikan University
Rittō, Shiga
Rival Schools
River City Ransom

Ro
Robotech
Rodan
Rōjū
Roketsuzome (also: Rozome)
Rokudan
Rokuhara Tandai
Rokurokubi
Roland Corporation
Romanization
Romanization of Japanese
Ronin
Ronin (film)
Bondage rope harness
Roppongi
Roppongi Hills
Roy (Fire Emblem)
Royal Space Force: The Wings of Honneamise

Ru
Rubeshibe, Hokkaidō
Ruby (programming language)
Ruby character
Rulers of Japan
Rumiko Takahashi
Rumoi, Hokkaidō
Rumoi Subprefecture
Ruri Hoshino
Rurouni Kenshin
Russo-Japanese War
Ruth Benedict

Ry
Ryōji Noyori
Ryoju Kikuchi
Ryōkan
Ryokan (Japanese inn)
Ryoko Tani
Ryōnan, Kagawa
Ryotsu, Niigata
Ryu (Street Fighter)
Ryū (school)
Ryu Hayabusa
Ryūgasaki, Ibaraki
Ryugatake, Kumamoto
Ryuhoku, Kumamoto
Ryuichi Abe
Ryuichi Sakamoto
Ryujin, Wakayama
Ryukyu Islands
Ryūkyū Kingdom
Ryukyuan languages
Ryukyuan songs
Ryukyu robin
Ryūyō, Shizuoka

Q